These are the results of the men's K-2 10000 metres competition in canoeing at the 1952 Summer Olympics. The K-2 event is raced by two-man canoe sprint kayaks.

Medalists

Final
The final took place July 27.

References

1952 Summer Olympics official report. p. 631.
Sports-reference.com 1952 K-2 10000 m results

Men's K-2 10000
Men's events at the 1952 Summer Olympics